Buse Arslan (born 29 December 1992) is a Turkish actress and model known for her role as 'Berrak Tezcan' in Kocaman Ailem (2018) and her role as 'Aygül Hatun' in Kuruluş: Osman (2019–).

Biography
Buse Arslan was born on 29 December 1992 in Istanbul. started her acting career for the first time in 2011 in the TV series Akasya Durağı. She played the character of "Berrak Tezcan" in My Kocaman Ailem, one of the series she played in 2018, and later, she played the role of "Aygül Hatun" in Kuruluş: Osman. The actress commented on Aygül being quick-witted and determined.

Graduated from Beykent University, Faculty of Fine Arts and Department of Acting, she afterward completed her master's degree in Kadir Has University Film and Drama Acting Department. She married the Turkish businessman Kazım Akdeniz in 2016 and divorced in 2021.

Filmography

References

External links 
  
 

1992 births
Actresses from Istanbul
Living people
Turkish film actresses
Turkish television actresses
21st-century Turkish actresses
Turkish female models